Gaillardia parryi, or Parry's blanketflower, is a North American species of flowering plant in the sunflower family. It is native to the southwestern United States (Arizona and Utah). Some of the populations are inside Grand Canyon National Park, others in Grand Staircase–Escalante National Monument.

Gaillardia parryi grows in clay or sandy soils in places dominated by sagebrush, pinyon pine, or yellow pine. Each head has 8-14 yellow ray flowers surrounding sometimes as many as 100 yellow disc flowers.

References

External links
Lady Bird Johnson Wildflower Center, University of Texas

parryi
Flora of the Colorado Plateau and Canyonlands region
Flora of Arizona
Flora of Utah
Endemic flora of the United States
Plants described in 1874
Taxa named by Edward Lee Greene
Flora without expected TNC conservation status